Glenea apicaloides is a species of beetle in the family Cerambycidae. It was described by Stephan von Breuning in 1958. It is known from Uganda.

References

Endemic fauna of Uganda
apicaloides
Beetles described in 1958